Rage is the third studio album by American metalcore band Attila. The album was released on May 11, 2010, through Artery Recordings. It is the band's debut release on the label. The album charted on Billboard US Heatseekers chart at number 15.

The album was produced by Stephan Hawkes, who has previously worked with such bands as Burning the Masses and American Me.

Track listing

Personnel
Attila
Chris Fronzak – vocals
Nate Salameh – rhythm guitar
Chris Linck – lead guitar
Paul Ollinger – bass
Sean Heenan – drums, percussion

Production
 Produced and engineered by Stephan Hawkes
 Executive production by Eric Rushing (The Artery Foundation)
 A&R, management and layout by Mike Milford
 Artwork by Aaron Crawford

References

2010 albums
Attila (metalcore band) albums
Artery Recordings albums